Christian Friedrich Henrici (January 14, 1700 – May 10, 1764), writing under the pen name Picander, was a German poet and librettist for many of the cantatas which Johann Sebastian Bach composed in Leipzig.

Henrici was born in Stolpen. He studied law at Wittenberg and Leipzig. He wrote to supplement his income from tutoring and continued even after obtaining regular employment as a civil servant.

Librettist for Johann Sebastian Bach 
Bach moved to Leipzig in 1723. There is uncertainty as to who was writing the libretti he set during his first years in the city. The authors of the libretti for the Chorale cantata cycle of 1724/25 are anonymous. By 1725, Henrici and Bach were working together. Some of Bach's most important works used Henrici's libretti. Most notably their collaboration was on religious works in a Lutheran tradition such as the St Matthew Passion (BWV 244). However, they also produced secular works such as the Shepherds' Cantata of 1725 and the later Coffee Cantata and Peasant Cantata.

Sammlung Erbaulicher Gedanken 
For a year from the start of Advent 1724 Picander had published spiritual poetry in weekly editions, which he collected in 1725 as Sammlung Erbaulicher Gedanken. This caught Bach's eye who started using Picander's poetry for his cantatas from 1725, and used poems from Picander's first collection in his St Matthew Passion.

Ernst-Schertzhaffte und Satyrische Gedichte 
All volumes of Picander's  (Leipzig, 1727–51) contain texts set to music by J. S. Bach, including those for the St Matthew Passion and its associated funeral music for Prince Leopold of Anhalt-Cöthen (Klagt, Kinder, klagt es aller Welt, BWV 244a).

Volumes and editions:
 Vol. I: 1727, reprinted in 1732 and 1736.
 Vol. II: 1729, reprinted in 1734.
 Vol. III: 1732, reprinted in 1737. This volume contained texts published in 1728 as Cantaten auf die Sonn- und Fest-Tage durch das gantze Jahr.
 Vol. IV: 1737.
 Reworked fourth edition, containing a selection of previous editions, in two volumes: 1748.
 Vol. V: 1751.

Lost scores and reconstructions
In some cases, Henrici's texts have survived and Bach's settings have not. The lost scores include cases where the music has vanished without trace and others where there are clues as to what music Bach used to set the words, allowing the possibility of reconstruction.

Lost scores
In the preface to the third volume (1732) Picander claimed that J. S. Bach set a whole cycle of his cantata texts in 1729. Only nine of J. S. Bach's settings are known to have survived (they include the cantatas for Christmas Ehre sei Gott in der Höhe, BWV 197a, New Year Gott, wie dein Name, so ist auch dein Ruhm, BWV 171, Whit Monday Ich liebe den Höchsten von ganzem Gemüte, BWV 174, and the feast of St Michael Man singet mit Freuden vom Sieg, BWV 149) the statement made in the preface has been debated.

Reconstructed scores
Examples of reconstructions include the funeral music for Prince Leopold and the St Mark Passion (BWV 247) where Bach's music can be reconstructed because it is known to have been used in surviving pieces. Bach sometimes returned to compositions commissioned for one-off occasions and recycled the music. Picander was able to help the composer in this process by providing metrically similar new texts, effectively setting words to Bach's music.

References

Sources
  Paul Flossman. Picander (Christian Friedrich Henrici). Leipzig: Liebertwolkwitz (1899)

External links

"Henrici, Christian Friedrich (Pseudonym: Picander)", Biographisch-Bibliographisches Kirchenlexikon  

1700 births
1764 deaths
German poets
German cantata librettists
German oratorio and passion librettists
18th-century pseudonymous writers
Leipzig University alumni
German male poets